The 1924 Oglethorpe Stormy Petrels football team was an American football team that represented Oglethorpe University in the Southern Intercollegiate Athletic Association (SIAA) during the 1924 college football season. In its first season under head coach Harry J. Robertson, the team compiled a 6–3–1 record (5–0 against SIAA opponents), tied with Centre for the SIAA championship, and outscored opponents by a total of 140 to 86. Adrian Maurer was the team captain.

Schedule

References

Oglethorpe
Oglethorpe Stormy Petrels football seasons
Oglethorpe Stormy Petrels football